Football in the United States may refer to:

 American football, sport
 American football in the United States, sport in the country
 Australian rules football in the United States
 Gaelic football in the United States
 Rugby league in the United States
 Rugby union in the United States
 Soccer in the United States, association football